Ezel Akay (born 20 January 1961) is a Turkish film actor, film director and film producer.

Life and work
After Ezel Akay graduated as a mechanical engineer from the Boğaziçi University, he was trained as actor at the US-American Villanova University.

Before Ezel Akay started to work in the Turkish film business and co-founded the Turkish production company IFR, he worked as copywriter, theatre director and –actor. Since the foundation of his film production company IFR, Ezel Akay directed more than 500 commercials.

In 1996 Ezel Akay produced together with the Turkish film director Dervis Zaim for Zaim's debut feature Somersault in a Coffin, which won several national and international prizes. Where's Firuze? was the first feature, which Ezel Akay directed.

Filmography
1996: Somersault in a Coffin (Tabutta Rövaşata) (producer)
1999: Journey to the Sun (Güneşe Yolculuk) (executive producer)
2001: Elephants and Grass (Filler ve Çimen) (actor)
2001: The Waterfall (producer, actor)
2004: Where's Firuze? (Neredesin Firuze), (director, producer, actor)
2005: Making Boats out of Watermellon Rinds (Karpuz Kabuğundan Gemiler Yapmak) (producer)
2005: Robbery Alla Turca (Hırsız Var!), (actor)
2006: Killing the Shadows (Hacivat Karagöz Neden Öldürüldü?), (director, producer, writer, and actor)
2006: The Road Home (Eve Giden Yol) (actor)
2007: Adam and the Devil (Adem'in Trenleri) (producer, actor)
2007: Sözün Bittiği Yer (actor)
2007: Hicran Sokağı (actor)
2009: 7 Husbands for Hürmüz (7 Kocalı Hürmüz), (director, actor)
2011: Gümüş Lale Burası Osmanlı 1711 (director, scriptwriter)
2013: F Type Film - 9 jail stories, (director, actor - episode 2)
2014: Küçük Kara Balıklar (director)
2017: Martıların Efendisi (actor)
2020: Leyla Everlasting (9 Kere Leyla), (director, producer, scriptwriter)
2020: Yarım Kalan Aşklar (actor)

References

External links

1961 births
Living people
Turkish male film actors
Turkish film directors
Turkish film producers
Turkish people of Circassian descent
Turkish mechanical engineers
Best Director Golden Boll Award winners
People from İnegöl
Boğaziçi University alumni
Villanova University alumni